Sir Cahir O'Doherty ( or ; 1587–5 July 1608) was the last Gaelic Chief of the Name of Clan O'Doherty and Lord of Inishowen, in what is now County Donegal. O'Doherty was a noted loyalist during Tyrone's Rebellion and became known as the Queen's O'Doherty for his service on the Crown's side during the fighting. 

After the war O'Doherty had ambitions to become a courtier and applied for a position in the household of Henry Frederick, Prince of Wales, but he increasingly came into dispute with Irish-based officials such as the Viceroy Sir Arthur Chichester and the Governor of Derry Sir George Paulet. In 1608 he launched a rebellion, seizing Derry from Paulet and burning it to the ground. O'Doherty was subsequently killed in a battle at Kilmacrennan, and the rebellion swiftly collapsed.

Early life
Cahir was the son of Sir John O'Doherty, the head of the O'Dohertys and effective ruler of Inishowen. One of Cahir's younger sisters was Rosa who first married Cathbarr O'Donnell and later Owen Roe O'Neill. A third was Margaret, who married Oghie O'Hanlon. Cahir was fourteen when his father died and he had to spend the next few years gaining control of his lordship. Cahir's foster father was Phelim Reagh MacDavitt (Mac Daibhéid).

Cahir was knighted by Lord Mountjoy, and for a time he seemed prepared to work amicably with the English authorities: he found a strong supporter in Sir Henry Docwra, the first Governor of Derry. His marriage to Mary Preston, daughter of the 4th Viscount Gormanston, allied him to some of the leading nobles of the Pale, including Thomas FitzWilliam, 1st Viscount FitzWilliam, who in 1608 was required to stand surety for O'Doherty's good behaviour. 

O'Doherty and Niall Garve O'Donnell, the main rival of Red Hugh O'Donnell for the leadership of the O'Donnell dynasty, were the principal Gaelic chieftains whose support the English Crown hoped to gain through a policy of moderation and for a time this policy seemed to be working.

O'Doherty's Rebellion

Caught up in conspiracies caused by the Flight of the Earls and angered by the confiscation of his lands for the Plantation of Ulster, in 1608 Sir Cahir sacked and burned the town of Derry and Cahir's foster-father Felim Riabhach McDavitt (Mac Daibhéid) killed  Docwra's successor as  Governor, Sir George Paulet, with whom Cahir had repeatedly quarrelled. Paulet was accused by some of goading O'Doherty into rebellion by a series of insults,  and was also said to have assaulted him. Niall Garve O'Donnell, previously a loyal supporter of the English Crown, was also accused of supporting the rebellion. O'Doherty's precise motives for the rebellion are unclear, and its timing is also something of a puzzle, especially as the Privy Council of Ireland had just ordered that the remainder of his lands be restored to him. Taking revenge on Paulet was perhaps a sufficient motive in itself.

O'Doherty was killed during the Battle of Kilmacrennan against a counter-attacking force under Lord Powerscourt His surviving soldiers retreated and made a last stand at the Siege of Tory Island.

Legacy
His severed head was displayed on a spike over Newgate Prison in Dublin for some time afterwards. Niall Garve O'Donnell and his son Neachtain were arrested and sent to the Tower of London, where they died.

According to historian Brian Bonner, "While and where the old traditions were retained in Inis Eoghain, Cathaoir was seen as a mighty one of the Gael. He was loved and honoured. His memory was revered and relationship with his line was a privilege which brought dignity and status to the rightful claimant. The passage of time has now dimmed his memory and the English-speaking native community has developed a distorted view of this great son of Inis Eoghain. It is indeed a paradox that the planters' view of the 'villain' who sacked Culmore and burned Derry has been passed on to the descendants of those whom Cathaoir Rua strove to defend and protect."

During the 1990s, the Chief Herald of Ireland offered recognition to descendants of the chiefs of some ancient clans as recognised under the English system of primogeniture, rather than the original Brehon Law succession practice of tanistry, calling them the Chiefs of the Name. The chieftainship of the Dohertys was claimed by Dr. Ramón Salvador O'Dogherty, who claimed descent from Cahir O'Doherty's brother, Sean. 

In July 1990, an O'Dogherty clan gathering was held and Ramon Salvador O'Dogherty was installed as "Chief of the Name" at a ceremony in Belmont House (present-day Shantallow, County Londonderry). O'Dogherty received a traditional white wand of office and a sword which Cahir O'Doherty bore at the time of his death in battle at Kilmacrenan in 1608.

References

Bibliography
 Dougherty, Rob. O'Doherty's Rebellion 2008.
 McCavitt, John. The Flight of the Earls, An Illustrated History, Gill & MacMillan, 2002.

External links
O'Doherty Coat of Arms
O'Dochartaigh (Doherty) Clann

1587 births
1608 deaths
Irish lords
Irish rebels
16th-century Irish people
17th-century Irish people
People from County Donegal
People of O'Doherty's rebellion